The Zanzibar guitarfish (Rhinobatos zanzibarensis) is a species of fish in the Rhinobatidae family endemic to Tanzania.  Its natural habitats are open seas and shallow seas.

References

Zanzibar guitarfish
Endemic fauna of Tanzania
Fish of Tanzania
Zanzibar
Zanzibar guitarfish
Taxonomy articles created by Polbot
Taxobox binomials not recognized by IUCN